The Seremban Jamek Mosque is an old mosque in Seremban, Negeri Sembilan, Malaysia. It is located on the corners of Jalan Yam Tuan and Jalan Dato' Bandar Tunggal. Its architectural style is old Malaccan mosque style.

See also
 Islam in Malaysia

References

Mosques in Negeri Sembilan
Buildings and structures in Seremban